Signal lights may refer to:

Traffic light, signal lights controlling automotive & pedestrian traffic flow
Turn signals, signal lights indicating automotive change of direction
Railway signalling, use of signal lights to control train traffic flow
Signal lamp, a device for communicating between ships with flashing lights.